Tisobis Valley is an ice-free valley just northeast of Mount Henderson in Britannia Range. Named in association with Britannia by a University of Waikato (N.Z.) geological party, 1978–79, led by Michael Selby. Tisobis is a historical name used in Roman Britain for the River Dwyryd.

Valleys of Oates Land